The women's tournament in Basketball at the 2013 Southeast Asian Games in Naypyidaw began on 8 December and ended on 16 December. All games were held in the Zayar Thiri Indoor Stadium which for both men's and women's tournaments.

Venue
The Zayar Thiri Indoor Stadium is located in Naypyidaw. It was the host stadium of the tournament for both men's and women's basketball. The stadium's capacity is about 3,000 with a dimension of 91,809 square feet. It was also the hosts of volleyball, judo, vovinam and pencak silat of the games.

Competition format
All seven teams will play their opponents once. Unlike, the past Southeast Asian Games, there has been no knockout stages in the tournament. The team that finishes the best record will win the title.
*The team has fewer than two players available to play on the court at some point during the game.**A team cannot put forward at least five players at the start of the game, or its own actions prevent play from being resumed.
In case teams are tied on points, the tiebreaking criteria are used, in order of first application:
Results of the games involving the tied teams (head-to-head records)
Goal average of the games involving the tied teams
Goal average of all of the games played
Points scored
Drawing of lots

Results
All times are Myanmar Standard Time (UTC+06:30).

|}

Medal winners

See also
Men's tournament

References

Women's basketball at the Southeast Asian Games
women's
2013 in women's basketball
International women's basketball competitions hosted by Myanmar
2013–14 in Philippine basketball
2013–14 in Malaysian basketball
2013–14 in Indonesian basketball
2013–14 in Thai basketball